The sixth season of Nouvelle Star aired from February 21 to June 13, 2008. Virginie Efira hosted her third season. Novelties of the season were brought with a change in the judging panel as André Manoukian remained as the only former jury member. Next to him, Lio, Sinclair and Philippe Manœuvre judged the contestants for the first time. Also a veto power was introduced in which the judges had the right to save an eliminated contestant which they used at their first opportunity. A similar element was later seen in the eighth season of American Idol.
 
Auditions were held in the following cities:
 Marseilles
 Lille 
 Toulouse
 Rennes 
 Lyon 
 Brussels
 Paris 
 Strasbourg (first time used as a casting location)
The season also saw several contestants using artistic names instead of their real ones:

Candidates

The judges this series were eligible to exercise a veto power on one eliminated contestant at any given point of the competition and spare them from elimination. The power was exercised in the very first live programme when Kristov received the fewest votes and thus no-one was sent home the first week.

Top 10 Finalists

Elimination chart

External links 
 Official site

Season 06
2008 French television seasons